Fain Lake is a reservoir located near Prescott Valley in Yavapai County, North Central Arizona.

Fish species
 Rainbow Trout
 Brook Trout
 Brown Trout
 Largemouth Bass
 Channel Catfish
 Bluegill
 Green Sunfish
 Yellow Bullhead

References

External links
 Arizona Boating Locations Facilities Map
 Arizona Fishing Locations Map
 Chapter 7. Gila River and Wilcox Playa Watershed Edited by U.S. Fish and Wildlife Service U.S. Fish and Wildlife Service and Arizona Game and Fish Department Arizona Game and Fish Department

Reservoirs in Yavapai County, Arizona